George W. Logan House, also known as Jobe Hill, is a historic home located near Rutherfordton, Rutherford County, North Carolina.  It built about 1842, and is a one-story, five bay, Georgian plan frame dwelling.  It is sheathed in weatherboard, has a side gable roof, and two rebuilt exterior end chimneys. It was enlarged and remodeled in the 1890s and in 1985. Also on the property are the contributing brick well house, dairy, outhouse, smokehouse, granary, log double corncrib, and a large log barn.  It was the home of prominent North Carolina politician George Washington Logan (1815-1889).

It was added to the National Register of Historic Places in 1986.

References

Houses on the National Register of Historic Places in North Carolina
Georgian architecture in North Carolina
Houses completed in 1842
Houses in Rutherford County, North Carolina
National Register of Historic Places in Rutherford County, North Carolina
Rutherfordton, North Carolina